Triacanthella is a genus of springtails in the family Hypogastruridae. There are at least 20 described species in Triacanthella.

Species
These 22 species belong to the genus Triacanthella:

 Triacanthella alba Carpenter, 1909 i c g
 Triacanthella andina Cassagnau & Rapoport, 1962 i c g
 Triacanthella biroi Stach, 1924 i c g
 Triacanthella clavata (Willem, 1902) i c g
 Triacanthella copelandi (Wray, 1963) i c g
 Triacanthella enderbyensis Salmon, 1949 i c g
 Triacanthella frigida Cassagnau, 1959 i c g
 Triacanthella intermedia Dunger & Zivadinovic, 1984 i c g
 Triacanthella massoudi Najt, 1973 i c g
 Triacanthella michaelseni Schäffer, 1897 i c g
 Triacanthella najtae Izarra, 1971 i c g
 Triacanthella nivalis Cassagnau & Deharveng, 1974 i c g
 Triacanthella perfecta Denis, 1926 i c g
 Triacanthella purpurea Salmon, 1943 i c g
 Triacanthella rosea Wahlgren, 1906 i c g
 Triacanthella rubra Salmon, 1941 i c g
 Triacanthella setacea Salmon, 1941 i c g
 Triacanthella sorenseni Salmon, 1949 i c g
 Triacanthella terrasilvatica Salmon, 1943 i c g
 Triacanthella travei Cassagnau & Deharveng, 1974 i c g
 Triacanthella violacea Womersley, 1939 i c g
 Triacanthella vogeli Weiner & Najt, 1997 i c g

Data sources: i = ITIS, c = Catalogue of Life, g = GBIF, b = Bugguide.net

References

Further reading

 
 
 

Collembola
Springtail genera